Mudun (Ancient Greek: Μουδών) is an archaeological site in the northeastern Bari province of Somalia.

Overview

Mudun is situated in the Wadi valley of the Iskushuban District. The area features a number of ruins, which local tradition holds belong to an ancient, large town. Among the old structures are the remains of three huge mosques. These buildings are surrounded by around 2,000 tombs, which possess high towers and are dome-shaped.

See also
Bulhar
Damo
Mosylon
Maduna
Salweyn
Somali aristocratic and court titles

References

Archaeological sites in Somalia
Former populated places in Somalia
Ancient Somalia
Ancient Greek geography of East Africa
Archaeological sites of Eastern Africa